Dejan Perić (born 16 April 1979) is a Serbian football defender.

External links
 
 Dejan Perić stats at utakmica.rs 
 

1979 births
Living people
Sportspeople from Pančevo
Association football defenders
Serbian footballers
FK Dinamo Pančevo players
FK Obilić players
FK Voždovac players
FK Čukarički players
FK Sloga Kraljevo players
FK Banat Zrenjanin players
FK Mačva Šabac players
Serbian SuperLiga players
Serbian expatriate footballers
Serbian expatriate sportspeople in Greece
Panserraikos F.C. players